O is the eighth studio album by Japanese J-pop singer and songwriter Maki Ohguro. It was released on 12 December 2001 under new label EMI Japan by distributors Universal Music Japan. The album includes two previously released singles, such as "Niji wo Koete" and "Yuki ga Furu Mae ni". "Promise I Do" features backing vocals of Japanese pop singer Hikaru Utada.

The album reached No. 8 on its first week on the Oricon chart, and sold 89,000 copies.

Track listing
All tracks arranged by Takeshi Hayama.

In media
Niji wo Koete: commercial song of Morinaga Milk Industry's Lactoferrin Yogurt
Yuki ga Furu Mae ni: theme song for Tokyo Broadcasting System Television television drama Kochira Dai San Kaishabu
Starlight ~Utsukushii Hoshi ni Kidzukanakereba~: theme song for Tokyo Broadcasting System Television program Zone
Promise I do: commercial song of Taisho Pharmaceutical Co.'s Zena

References

Universal Music Japan albums
Japanese-language albums
2001 albums
Maki Ohguro albums